The 2017 Pan American Women's Club Handball Championship will be the second edition of the tournament organised by the Pan-American Team Handball Federation, and will be held in Asuncion, Paraguay 23–28 October.

Participating teams
 Jockey Club
 Vicente López
 EC Pinheiros
 Ovalle Balonmano
 Atlético Triunfo
 Nueva Estrella
 BBC Layva
 Club Atlético Goes

Preliminary round

Group A

All times are local (UTC−03:00).

Group B

Knockout stage

Bracket

5–8th place bracket

5–8th place semifinals

Semifinals

Seventh place game

Fifth place game

Third place game

Final

Final standing

Awards
All-star team
Goalkeeper:  Alice Fernandes da Silva
Right Wing:  Isabelle dos Santos
Right Back:  Macarena Sans
Playmaker:  Alejandra Scarrone
Left Back:  Florencia Ponce de Leon
Left Wing:  Martina Barreiro
Pivot:  Giuliana Gavilan

References

External links
Page of the championship on PATHF website

Pan American Women's Club Handball Championship
Pan American Women's Club Handball Championship
International sports competitions hosted by Paraguay
2017 in Paraguayan sport
Pan American